Janet Holmes may refer to:
 Janet Holmes (poet), American poet and professor
 Janet Holmes (linguist), New Zealand sociolinguist

See also
 Janet Holmes à Court, Australian businesswoman